List of motorcycles of the 1910s is a listing of motorcycles of the 1910s, including those on sale, introduced, or otherwise relevant in this period.

The 1910s has their share of expensive historic motorcycles sold at auction, especially the brands Cyclone and Flying Merkel. A 1915 Cyclone Board Track Racer went for US$852,500 at an auction in 2015, one of the just 12 that survived; another of this model sold for $551,200 in 2008. A 1911 Flying Merkel Board Track Racer went for $423,500 in 2015 and a 1911 Flying Merkel for $201,250 in 2011.  A 1911 Harley-Davidson 7D went for $283,400 in 2014. The $850k for the Cyclone Board Track was the highest price yet known to be paid publicly for a motorcycle auction (of any decade).

Examples 

Acme
Acme (by EMY Ready)
Adria (motorcycle)
AJS Model D
ANA
Autoped
Bat No. 2 Light Roadster
Blackburne motorcycles
Bi-Autogo
Cleveland motorcycle
Cyclone motorcycles
Cyclone Board Track Racer (1915 V-Twin).
Detroit Single motorcycle
Flying Merkel Model 471
Flying Merkel Board Track Racer
Flying Merkel Model 50
Flying Merkel Model 70
FN Four (various version produced, 1905–1923)
Harley-Davidson Model 7D
Harley-Davidson Model J
Harley-Davidson Model 10F
Harley-Davidson Model W
Harley-Davidson 8A
Harley-Davidson X8A (1912)
Harley-Davidson 11F
Hazlewoods models 1911 to 1924
Hazlewoods with  3.5 hp JAP engine
Hazlewoods Colonial
Henderson Motorcycle models
Henderson Model A (1912)
Henderson Model B (1913)
Henderson Model C (1914)
Henderson Model F (1916)
Henderson Model G (1917)
Henderson Model H (1918)
Henderson Model Z (1919)
Henderson Four Generator
Husqvarna Moto-Reve model 1910 
Indian Model O
Indian Powerplus
Indian Scout (Came out in October 1919 (1920 model year))
Iver Johnson motorcycle
Marsh Metz motorcycle
Minneapolis Model S-2 Deluxe Twin
Militaire Four aka Militaire Model 2
Norton 16H
Peugeot 500 M
Pierce Four, sold from 1909 to 1913
NSU Motorenwerke, NSU 350 TT, Heeresmodel
Pierce Single
Pope Model L
Pope Model K
Pope Model 8L
Rover (motorcycles) models including 248 cc, 348 cc, and 676 cc JAP V-twin.
Rover TT 500CC (1913)
Rover 3 1/2 h.p. (1911)
Rover Imperial 500 cc (1916)
Royal Pioneer
Sears Dreadnought
Thor Model U
Triumph Model H
Wanderer, Models 2 pk (250 cc), 4 pk (504 cc)
Wilkinson TMC
Williamson Flat Twin
Winchester 6 HP

Gallery

Manufacturers and marques

Some companies had a brand for their motorcycles

Hendee Manufacturing Company
Indian
Aurora Automatic Machinery Company
Thor
Joerns Motor Manufacturing Company
Cyclone
Consolidated Manufacturing (of Toledo, Ohio)
Yale
Light Manufacturing and Foundry Company 
Light Merkel
Miami Cycle and Manufacturing Company of Middletown, Ohio
Flying Merkel
Pope Manufacturing Company,
Pope

Trike
Minneapolis Model N Tricar

See also

Cyclecars
Ford Model T
Horse and buggy
List of motorcycle manufacturers
List of motorcycles of the 1890s
List of motorcycles of 1900 to 1909
List of motorcycles of the 1920s
List of motorcycles of the 1930s
List of motorcycles of the 1940s
List of motorcycles by type of engine
List of motorized trikes
Safety bicycle

References

External links
Motorcycles of the 1900s to 1920s
Harley-Davidson Motorcycles of the 1900s and 1920s
Smithsonian - The Early Days of motorcycle racing

Motorcycles introduced in the 1910s
Lists of motorcycles